Night Boats is a 2012 Croatian drama film directed by Igor Mirković.

Cast 
 Ana Karić as Helena
 Radko Polič as Jakov
 Renata Ulmanski as Olgica
 Lana Barić as Anja
 Bogdan Diklić as Marko
  as Tonka
 Mirna Medaković as Trafikantica
  as Vlado
 Jadranka Đokić as Frizerka
 Pero Kvrgić as General

References

External links 
Night Boats at belafilm.si

2012 drama films
2012 films
Croatian drama films
Films about old age